Guagusa Shekudad is one of the woredas in the Amhara Region of Ethiopia. Part of the Agew Awi Zone, Guagusa Shekudad is bordered on the west by Ankasha Guagusa, on the north by Banja Shekudad, and on the east and south by the Mirab Gojjam Zone. Towns in Guagusa Shekudad include Tilili. Guagusa Shekudad was part of former Banja woredas.

Demographics
Based on the 2007 national census conducted by the Central Statistical Agency of Ethiopia (CSA), this woreda has a total population of 83,930, of whom 41,427 are men and 42,503 women; 9,043 or 10.78% are urban inhabitants. The majority of the inhabitants practiced Ethiopian Orthodox Christianity, with 99.91% reporting that as their religion.

Notes

Districts of Amhara Region